The Kaunas pogrom was a massacre of Jews living in Kaunas, Lithuania, that took place on 25–29 June 1941; the first days of Operation Barbarossa and the Nazi occupation of Lithuania. The most infamous incident occurred at the garage of NKVD Kaunas section, a nationalized garage of Lietūkis, an event known as the  Lietūkis Garage Massacre. There several dozen Jewish men, allegedly associates of NKVD, were publicly tortured and executed on 27 June in front of a crowd of Lithuanian men, women and children. The incident was documented by a German soldier who photographed the event as a man, nicknamed the "Death Dealer", beat each man to death with a metal bar. After June, systematic executions took place at various forts of the Kaunas Fortress, especially the Seventh and Ninth Fort.

Background

The Lithuanian Activist Front (LAF), a far-right underground organisation operating inside Soviet Lithuania, took control of the city and much of the Lithuanian countryside on the evening of 23 June 1941. Nazi SS Brigadeführer Franz Walter Stahlecker arrived in Kaunas on the morning of 25 June. He visited the headquarters of the Lithuanian Security Police and delivered a long anti-Semitic speech encouraging Lithuanians to solve the "Jewish problem". According to Stahlecker's report of 15 October, local Lithuanians were not enthusiastic about the pogrom and so he had to use Algirdas Klimaitis and his men. Klimaitis controlled a paramilitary unit of approximately 600 men that was organized in Tilsit by SD and was not subordinated to the LAF.

Massacre

Starting on 25 June, Nazi-organized units attacked Jewish civilians in Slobodka (Vilijampolė), the Jewish suburb of Kaunas that hosted the world-famous Slabodka yeshiva. According to Rabbi Ephraim Oshry, there were Germans present on the bridge to Slobodka, but it was the Lithuanian volunteers who killed the Jews. The rabbi of Slobodka, Rav Zalman Osovsky, was tied hand and foot to a chair, "then his head was laid upon an open volume of gemora (volume of the Talmud) and [they] sawed his head off", after which they murdered his wife and son. His head was placed in a window of the residence, bearing a sign: "This is what we'll do to all the Jews."

As of 28 June 1941, according to Stahlecker, 3,800 people had been killed in Kaunas and a further 1,200 in other towns in the immediate region. Some believe Stahlecker exaggerated his murder tally.

Controversy

There is controversy over who was primarily responsible for initiating the massacres: local Lithuanians or Nazi officials.

Memoirs of witnesses of the event say that German Nazi soldiers in uniforms participated in Lietūkis' sadistic tortures and massacres, but were also accompanied by some Lithuanians who were recently freed from the Kaunas Prison.

Some Lithuanians cite Franz Walter Stahlecker's report of 15 October to Heinrich Himmler. Stahlecker wrote that he had succeeded in covering up actions of the Vorkommando (German vanguard unit) and made it look like an initiative of the local population.

Other authors claim that massacres began even before the Germans arrived. They point out that executions took place in the countryside and not just in the city of Kaunas. Photography experts have suggested that many pictures from the Kaunas pogrom might have been falsified by gluing multiple pictures into one because there are many discrepancies in the pictures (e.g., different walls, doors locations, illumination and perspectives do not match). The infamous Death Dealer with blonde hair could have been not a Lithuanian, but a German Nazi Joachim Hamann who at the time acted in the territory. Historian Arvydas Anušauskas, an author of the film about the massacre, is skeptical about these theories, because, in addition to the photos, there are witness testimonies, as well as the testimony of the photographer, Wilhelmas Gunsilius (which he willed to publicize 10 years after his death).

See also

Kaunas Ghetto
Kaunas massacre of October 29, 1941

References

Conflicts in 1941
Jews and Judaism in Kaunas
Mass murder in 1941
History of Kaunas
1941 in Lithuania
Lithuanian collaboration with Nazi Germany
Holocaust massacres and pogroms in Lithuania
June 1941 events
20th century in Kaunas